The Church of the Immaculate Conception of the Blessed Virgin Mary may refer to:

Church of the Immaculate Conception of Blessed Virgin Mary, Texas, United States 
Church of the Immaculate Conception of the Blessed Virgin Mary, Venta, Lithuania 
Church of the Immaculate Conception of the Blessed Virgin Mary, Warsaw, Poland
Immaculate Conception of the Blessed Virgin Mary Church (Bronx), United States

See also 
 Church of the Immaculate Conception (disambiguation)